Tim Challies (born 1976) is a Canadian Reformed Baptist theologian, pastor, blogger, and author.

Career 
In 2003, Challies started a blog on theology, book reviews, and social commentary. He has published books on theology, among other topics, such as how Christians should approach common issues like technology and pornography.

He co-founded the publishing house Cruciform Press with Kevin Meath in 2010.

In 2013, he became pastor at Grace Fellowship Church of Toronto, a
Reformed Baptist church. 

In 2017, Challies gained media attention after stating that he does not let his children have sleep-overs besides close relatives. Challies explained that he places this precaution on his evaluated risk of how children can encounter "pornography, sexuality and drinking while at friends' homes."

R. Albert Mohler, Jr. has mentioned Challies as "one of the finest young evangelical thinkers of our day."

Personal life
Challies is married with three children. His son, Nicholas Paul Challies (Nick), passed away suddenly on November 3, 2020.

Books
The Discipline of Spiritual Discernment (Crossway, 2008)
Sexual Detox: A Guide for Guys Who Are Sick of Porn (Cruciform Press, 2010)
Do More Better: A Practical Guide to Productivity (Cruciform Press, 2015)
Visual Theology (with Josh Byers - Zondervan, 2016)
The Next Story: Faith, Friends, Family, and the Digital World (Thomas Nelson, 2015)
The Character of the Christian (Cruciform Press, 2017)
Set an Example (Cruciform Press, 2017)
Help! My Kids Are Viewing Pornography (Shepherd Press, 2017)
The Commandment We Forgot (Cruciform Press, 2017)
Devoted: Great Men and Their Godly Moms (Cruciform Press, 2018)
Advance! (Cruciform Press, 2018)
Aging Gracefully (Cruciform Press, 2018)
Run to Win: The Lifelong Pursuits of a Godly Man (Cruciform Press, 2018)

References

External links
 

1976 births
21st-century Calvinist and Reformed ministers
21st-century Calvinist and Reformed theologians
Canadian bloggers
Canadian Calvinist and Reformed ministers
Canadian Calvinist and Reformed theologians
21st-century Canadian Baptist ministers
Christian bloggers
Critics of the Catholic Church
Living people